Global Alliance Against Traffic in Women
 Global Alliance for Clean Cookstoves
 Global Alliance for EcoMobility
 Global Alliance for Genomics and Health (GA4GH)
 Global Alliance for Improved Nutrition
 Global Alliance for Information and Communication Technologies and Development
 Global Alliance for Preserving the History of WWII in Asia
 Global Alliance for Project Performance Standards
 Global Alliance for Rabies Control
 Global Alliance for TB Drug Development
 Global Alliance in Management Education
 Global Alliance of Affirming Apostolic Pentecostals
 Global Alliance of Leading-Edge Schools
 Global Alliance on Accessible Technologies and Environments
 Global Alliance to Prevent Prematurity and Stillbirth
 Global ATM Alliance